General elections were held in Brazil on 1 March 1918. The presidential elections were won by former President Rodrigues Alves, who received 99.1% of the vote. However, he died of the Spanish flu in 1919 before he could take office. Vice-President Delfim Moreira became Acting President until fresh elections were held on 13 April 1919.

Results
The estimated population of Brazil in 1918 was of 28.9 million, of which just 1,726,000 were eligible to vote.

References

General elections in Brazil
Brazil
1918 in Brazil
March 1918 events
Election and referendum articles with incomplete results
Elections of the First Brazilian Republic